Timocratica guarani is a moth in the family Depressariidae. It was described by Vitor O. Becker in 1982. It is found in northern Argentina and Paraguay.

The wingspan is 12–14 mm. The ground colour of the forewings is white.

References

Moths described in 1982
Taxa named by Vitor Becker
Timocratica